Francinne Roy Rifol (born October 18, 2001), better known by her stage name Rans Rifol is a Filipino singer and actress. She was a former member of Filipino idol group MNL48.

Career

Career beginnings 

Rifol started appearing in television commercials when she was 11.

Singing 

Rifol became a member of the girl group MNL48 in 2018.

Acting 

In 2016, Rifol appeared in the film Patintero: Ang Alamat ni Meng Patalo.

Her appearance in the drama film Kun Maupay Man It Panahon won her the Best Supporting Actress award in the 2021 Metro Manila Film Festival.

Discography

MNL48

Filmography

Television

Film

Awards and nominations

References

External links
 

2001 births
Living people
Place of birth missing (living people)
21st-century Filipino women singers
Filipino film actresses
Filipino television actresses
MNL48
Star Magic